Thomas R. Sweeney (born July 1, 1995) is an American football tight end who is a free agent. He played college football at Boston College. He was drafted by the Buffalo Bills in the 7th round of the 2019 NFL Draft.

Early years
Sweeney grew up in Ramsey, New Jersey and attended Don Bosco Preparatory High School. He caught 27 passes for 539 yards and five touchdowns in his senior season.

College career
Sweeney played five seasons for the Boston College Eagles, redshirting his freshman season. As a redshirt junior, he led the team with 36 receptions, 512 receiving yards, and four touchdown receptions and was named third-team All-Atlantic Coast Conference (ACC). He capped off the season with seven catches for 137 yards and a touchdown against Iowa in the 2017 Pinstripe Bowl. In his final season with the Eagles, Sweeney had 32 catches for 348 yards and three touchdowns and was named first-team All-ACC. Sweeney finished his collegiate career with 99 receptions for 1,281 yards and 10 touchdowns in 38 career games.

Professional career

Sweeney was drafted by the Buffalo Bills in the seventh round (228th overall) of the 2019 NFL Draft. He signed a rookie contract with the team on May 9, 2019.

Sweeney made his NFL debut in the on September 8, 2019, in the Bills season opener, catching two passes for 35 yards in a 17–16 win over the New York Jets. Sweeney caught eight passes for 114 yards in six games played as a rookie.

Sweeney was placed on the active/physically unable to perform list (PUP) by the Bills due to a foot injury on July 28, 2020. He was placed on the reserve/PUP list to start the season on September 5, 2020. He was moved to the reserve/COVID-19 list by the team on October 24, 2020, and was activated back to the PUP list on November 11. However, he developed myocarditis as a result of the virus and was ruled out for the rest of the season. He was placed back on the reserve/COVID-19 list on November 23, 2020. In April 2021, Bills General Manager Brandon Beane announced that Sweeney should be ready for the 2021 season. Sweeney returned to the field in June 2021, when it was revelated that at one point in time, it was unknown if he'd be able to play again.

On October 18, 2021, Sweeney caught his first career touchdown in a loss to the Tennessee Titans.

NFL career statistics

Regular season

Postseason

References

External links
Boston College Eagles bio
Buffalo Bills bio

1995 births
Living people
American football tight ends
Boston College Eagles football players
Buffalo Bills players
Don Bosco Preparatory High School alumni
People from Ramsey, New Jersey
Players of American football from New Jersey
Sportspeople from Bergen County, New Jersey